The 2011 World Table Tennis Championships men's doubles was the 51st edition of the men's doubles championship.

Chen Qi and Wang Hao were the defending champions. For this event, Chen partnered Ma Lin while Hao teamed up with Zhang Jike.

Ma Long and Xu Xin, who were runners-up in 2009, won in the final against Chen Qi and Ma Lin 11–3, 11–8, 4–11, 11–4, 11–7.

Seeds
Doubles matches will be best of 5 games in qualification matches and best of 7 games in the 64-player sized main draw.

  Ma Long /  Xu Xin (world champions)
  Wang Hao /  Zhang Jike (semifinals)
  Chen Qi /  Ma Lin (final)
  Seiya Kishikawa /  Jun Mizutani (third round)
  Jiang Tianyi /  Tang Peng (second round)
  Kenta Matsudaira /  Koki Niwa (third round)
  Lee Jung-Woo /  Oh Sang-Eun (quarterfinals)
  Cheung Yuk /  Li Ching (third round)
  Gao Ning /  Yang Zi (third round)
  Patrick Baum /  Bastian Steger (quarterfinals)
  Lucjan Blaszczyk /  Wang Zeng Yi (second round)
  Ryu Seung-Min /  Seo Hyun-Deok (third round)
  Dimitrij Ovtcharov /  Christian Süß (first round)
  Chuang Chih-yuan /  Wu Chih-chi (second round)
  Jonathan Groth /  Kasper Sternberg (second round)
  Pär Gerell /  Jens Lundqvist (third round)
  Mattias Karlsson /  Robert Svensson (second round)
  Jung Young-Sik /  Kim Min-Seok (semifinals)
  Lei Kou /  Yevhen Pryshchepa (second round)
  Emmanuel Lebesson /  Adrien Mattenet (second round)
  Robert Gardos /  Daniel Habesohn (third round)
  Tiago Apolonia /  Joao Monteiro (second round)
  Ko Lai Chak /  Leung Chu Yan (third round)
  Pavel Platonov /  Vladimir Samsonov (quarterfinals)
  Achanta Sharath Kamal /  Subhajit Saha (first round)
  Kirill Skachkov /  Alexey Smirnov (second round)
  Jang Song-Man /  Kim Hyok-Bong (first round)
  Fedor Kuzmin /  Igor Rubtsov (second round)
  Petr Korbel /  Dmitrij Prokopcov (first round)
  Kazuhiro Chan /  Kenji Matsudaira (quarterfinals)
  Adrian Crişan /  Andrei Filimon (first round)
  Marko Jevtović /  Aleksandar Karakašević (second round)

Draw

Finals

Top half

Section 1

Section 2

Bottom half

Section 3

Section 4

References

External links
Main Draw

-